Sweet Inspiration is the eighteenth studio album recorded by Australian singer, Kate Ceberano. It was released in February 2021 and peaked at number 5 on the ARIA charts.

Speaking about the album, Ceberano said "What should have been a very simple, loving collection of favourite songs, recorded (just because) with friends over a few winters day in Melbourne... turned into an experience that will forever shape my future as an artist. The world turned suddenly upside down overnight with panic and unknowns, and singing seemed too simple – inappropriate and indulgent in the face of the times. But Nina Simone says the artist MUST 'sing for the times' and so I wrote 'Sweet Inspiration'. Inspired by a strong title and series of chords (thank you Rick Price) they sent me in the right direction."

Reception
Zoë Radas from Stack Magazine called the album "one of Kate's best" saying "Most covers albums are pointless, showing an artist out of ideas and playing it safe – a triumph of commercialism over creativity. But the occasional covers collection is something special, providing an insight into an artist's influences as well as giving new meaning to classic songs. These are soothing songs for the soul, and the perfect album for troubled times.".

Commercial performance
The album debuted at number 5 on the ARIA chart for the week commencing 15 February 2021. It is Ceberano's first top 5 album since Nine Lime Avenue in 2007 and is her seventh Australian top ten album.

Track listing

Charts

References

2021 albums
Sony Music Australia albums
Kate Ceberano albums